Louise Juliette Bouscaren, known as Juliette Figuier (4 February 1827, Montpellier – 6 December 1879, Paris), was a French playwright and novelist. She also published some works under the pseudonym Claire Sénart. She was the wife of Louis Figuier.

Selected works

References 

1827 births
1879 deaths
19th-century French women writers